The Frog and the Nightingale is a poem written by the Indian poet Vikram Seth in 1994. It is a fable about a frog and a nightingale. It was originally published by Evergreen Publications, and was later used by the Ministry of Education in India as a poem for school students. It has been in the Class 10th CBSE English text book.

Theme
The poem is a fable and like most fables it has a moral. Various themes are intertwined. The poem can be seen as exposing the role of critics towards any fresh talent; it can be read as exploitation of a simple, genuine talent by a personal gain or as a poem about a jealous person who does not let real talent flourish by discouraging and finally eliminating it. There is another subject the poet touched upon: a lack of confidence that leads to disaster and the poet comments that one must recognise one's own capabilities and should not try to emulate others. The poem is targeted at a young audience and teaches how to keep clear of cunning people who can exploit one's talents to their benefit. The use of animal characters in the poem is to appeal to a younger audience. The main characters are the frog and the nightingale, where the frog represents the cunning capitalist mind and the nightingale a vulnerable artist. The arrogant frog has been ruling the bog and torturing its residents with his cacophonous singing. The arrival of the nightingale and her singing provides the creatures in the bog a pleasant break who admire her sweet voice. The frog approaches her and appreciates her like a critic making her feeling flattered. He manipulates her making her sing for him in a concert and earns money by selling tickets. The poor creature does not know how she is being manipulated by the frog and sings till she has lost her voice and health. The frog pushes her to the verge where her health and energy fail her and she dies. The poem leaves behind a lesson that while it is good to be talented one must also watch one's weaknesses and instead of feeling flattered must cautiously tread one's way towards one's target. The nightingale was vulnerable to flattery and fell victim to the frog's manipulation.

References

1997 poems
Indian poetry